The following is a list of pipeline accidents in the United States in 1999. It is one of several lists of U.S. pipeline accidents. See also list of natural gas and oil production accidents in the United States.

Incidents 

This is not a complete list of all pipeline accidents. For natural gas alone, the Pipeline and Hazardous Materials Safety Administration (PHMSA), a United States Department of Transportation agency, has collected data on more than 3,200 accidents deemed serious or significant since 1987.

A "significant incident" results in any of the following consequences:
 fatality or injury requiring in-patient hospitalization
 $50,000 or more in total costs, measured in 1984 dollars
 liquid releases of five or more barrels (42 US gal/barrel)
 releases resulting in an unintentional fire or explosion

PHMSA and the National Transportation Safety Board (NTSB) post incident data and results of investigations into accidents involving pipelines that carry a variety of products, including natural gas, oil, diesel fuel, gasoline, kerosene, jet fuel, carbon dioxide, and other substances. Occasionally pipelines are repurposed to carry different products.

 1999 On January 2, a natural gas transmission pipeline exploded and burned at a pipeline facility near Pendleton, Oregon. Flames reached 500 feet high, and several towns lost gas service for a time.
 1999 Natural Gas Explosion and Fire at a gas pressure station, Wytheville, Virginia, destroying a home and motorcycle store. (January 3, 1999)
 1999 On January 8, a leak in a 12-inch pipe at a Koch Industries tank farm in Benavides County, Texas spilled about 10,500 barrels of crude oil. The cause was internal corrosion of the pipe.
 1999 In Bridgeport, Alabama, on January 22, while digging a trench behind a building, a backhoe operator damaged a 3/4-inch steel natural gas service line and a 1-inch water service line. This resulted in two leaks in the natural gas service line, which was operated at 35 psig. One leak occurred where the backhoe bucket had contacted and pulled the natural gas service line. The other was a physical separation of the gas service line at an underground joint near the meter, which was close to the building. Gas migrated into a building nearby, where it ignited. An explosion followed, destroying three buildings. Other buildings within a two-block area of the explosion sustained significant damage. Three fatalities, five serious injuries, and one minor injury resulted from this accident.
 1999 On January 23, a construction crew ruptured a 10-inch diameter petroleum products pipe near Germantown, Wisconsin, spilling about 41,000 gallons of gasoline.
A brittle-like crack was found on the pipe in an area of coating failure. The NTSB expressed concern that the material's toughness had a role in this rupture. Two days before the rupture, an in-line inspection device was run through the pipe segment, with no anomalies in the rupture area reported. Contributing to the severity of the accident was Colonial Pipeline Company's failure to determine from the SCADA system that a leak had occurred, with the result that the pipeline controller started and restarted the pipeline, increasing the amount of diesel fuel that was released.
 1999 On May 1, excavation equipment damaged a Koch Industries pipeline in Pleasant Hill, Iowa, spilling 3,663 barrels of crude oil.
 1999 The Olympic pipeline explosion: A pipeline in a Bellingham, Washington park ruptured and leaked gasoline, and later vapor from the leak exploded and burned, killing two 10-year-old boys and an 18-year-old man on June 10, 1999. Issues causing the rupture were found to be previous pipe damage by excavation, an incorrectly set up pressure relief valve, unexpected repeated remote valve closures, and new software tests on the live controlling computer.
 1999 On June 24, about 100 barrels of gasoline spilled in a Buckeye Partners Terminal in Breinigsville, Pennsylvania.
 1999 On August 4, a Sunoco pipeline leaked from internal corrosion, in Payne County, Oklahoma. About 15,100 gallons of petroleum products were spilled.
 1999 On August 10, an auger being used to install utility poles hit a 14-inch ethane-propane pipeline, causing an explosion & fire that killed the auger operator, and forcing evacuations near Liberty Hill, Texas. 
 1999 On August 29, a pump on Olympic Pipeline failed, in Renton, Washington, spilling about 3,360 gallons of gasoline and aviation fuel. About 950 tons of soil were removed due to contamination.
 1999 A Lakehead Pipeline (now Enbridge) was damaged by outside force, on November 1, near Crystal Falls, Michigan. 400 people were evacuated from the area. Fire was used to burn some of the released substances, so, of about 223,000 gallons of NGL's and crude oil spilled, only about 115,000 gallons were recovered, with over 2,100 yards of contaminated soil removed in just the first 2 weeks of cleaning. The pipe broke where it was on a rock in the pipeline trench.
 1999 On November 12, a natural-gas pipeline ruptured, killing one man, and injuring another. A spokeswoman for Northern Natural Gas said the 10-inch-diameter pipe was punctured by a digging crew in a field near Oelwein, Iowa, about 125 miles northeast of Des Moines. It ruptured 2 & 1/2 hours later, as gas company workers checked out the leak. Fire officials said the gas didn't ignite, though residents within a mile of the site were evacuated.
 1999 On November 19, 2 men were injured in Salt Flat, Texas, when a leaking 8-inch propane pipeline exploded. 2 school buses had passed through the area moments before the explosion. About 6,195 barrels of propane were leaked. The pipeline failed from external corrosion.

References

Lists of pipeline accidents in the United States